Davyd Heorhiyovych Arakhamia (born 23 May 1979), also known by the pseudonym David Braun, is a Russian-born Ukrainian politician and entrepreneur. He is a member of the Servant of the People political party. Arakhamia was elected to the Verkhovna Rada in 2019. In parliament he was elected as his party's faction leader on 29 August 2019.

Early life and career 
Davyd Heorhiyovych Arakhamia was born on 23 May 1979 in Sochi, in the Russian Soviet Federative Socialist Republic of the Soviet Union. He lived in Gagra in Georgia until in 1992, fleeing the war in Abkhazia, he moved with his parents to Mykolaiv, Ukraine.

Arakhamia passed the Professional Management master course at the Open University in London.

He is a co-founder of several IT companies including TemplateMonster and Weblium.

In March 2014, after the outbreak of the Russo-Ukrainian War, Arakhamia, along with friends, started a website to raise funds for the equipment of the paratroopers of the 79th Air Assault Brigade.

Political career 
Arakhamia was appointed as an Adviser to the Governor of Mykolaiv Oblast in August 2014. In October 2014, he became Adviser to the Minister of Defense and Chairman of the Council of Volunteers at the Ministry of Defense.

He has served as Secretary of the  since August 2019.

Servant of the People 
Arakhamia heads the parliamentary faction of Servant of the People.

In 2021, Arakhamia proclaimed that Servant of the People shared principles with the Chinese Communist Party, also stating that Ukraine "sees China as an example and considers it a strategic partner."

During the 2022 Russian invasion of Ukraine, Arakhamia was part of a close circle of advisors who remained in the capital of Kyiv with President Volodymyr Zelenskyy. On February 28, Arakhamia was named a member of the negotiating team sent to Pripyat on the Ukraine-Belarus border for talks on a potential ceasefire. In April, he said Russia had agreed to almost all Ukraine's peace proposals. He added that he had the "feeling that the US and the UK will be the last to join when they see that others agree".

Recognition 

In 2019, 2020, and 2021, Arakhamia was rated as one of the top 100 influential people of Ukraine according to the Novoye Vremya magazine, ranking 36th, 43rd and 37th place, respectively. In 2020, he took 21st place in the top 100 most influential Ukrainians according to the Focus magazine. In 2021, he took 6th place.

Controversy

Reopening North Crimean Canal 
On 11 February 2020, Arakhamia announced on Priamyi the possibility of restarting the supply of Russian-controlled Crimea through the North Crimean Canal. In response, he was widely condemned by other politicians and the Mejlis of the Crimean Tatar People, with the latter accusing him of "surrender". Arakhamia later apologised for his comments.

Sexism 
In late June 2020, Arakhamia and deputy leader of Servant of the People Oleksandr Kornienko were widely accused of sexism after a hot mic recording showed them describing female People's Deputy  in terms such as "working woman [...] like a ship pine", and, "bring someone like her to the President and you'll see... his jaw will fucking drop." Arakhamia claimed that the recording had been doctored, but Kornienko contradicted him, not only admitting that the remarks were true but stating that they had been about Tetiana Dombrovska, Servant of the People's candidate for mayor of Mykolaiv. Kornienko apologised both for himself and on behalf of Arakhamia.

Personal life 
Arakhamia has remarried after his first marriage. He has six children.

Awards 
 Order of Merit, Third Class – 2014

See also 
 List of members of the parliament of Ukraine, 2019–2023

Notes

References

External links 

 Verkhovna Rada (in Ukrainian)
 

1979 births
Living people
People from Sochi
21st-century Ukrainian businesspeople
Servant of the People (political party) politicians
Ninth convocation members of the Verkhovna Rada
21st-century Ukrainian politicians
People of the Euromaidan
Recipients of the Order of Merit (Ukraine), 3rd class
Ukrainian people of Georgian descent